The 2019–20 season was Gençlerbirliği's 97th year in existence. In addition to the domestic league, Gençlerbirliği participated in the Turkish Cup.

Squad

Süper Lig

League table

Results summary

Results by round

Matches

References
 

Gençlerbirliği seasons
Turkish football clubs 2019–20 season